"Exciter" is a song by English heavy metal band Judas Priest from their 1978 album Stained Class. It is the opening track and is an early example of speed metal. According to former guitarist K.K. Downing their drummer Les Binks accidentally came up with the drum intro for the song at a soundcheck on their Sin After Sin tour.

Canadian heavy metal band Exciter took its name from this song.

1990 trial
During the 1990 civil action brought against the band, "Exciter" was played backwards to the court. Lead vocalist Rob Halford demonstrated that, when played in reverse, the song appeared to contain the phrase: "I asked for a peppermint, I asked for her to get one." This action showed that by playing any song in reverse,  phrases could be formed by the human brain. The same point applied to "Better by You, Better than Me", which had a sound that could be interpreted as "do it".

Track listing
In Japan, the song was released as a single in 1978.

References

1978 songs
CBS Records singles
Columbia Records singles
Judas Priest songs
Songs written by Rob Halford
Songs written by Glenn Tipton